Jaume March may refer to:
Jaume March I, see Arnau March
Jaume March II (1334x1335–1410), Catalan language poet